Soompi is an English-language website providing coverage of Korean pop culture. It has one of the largest international Internet communities for K-pop, mostly concentrated in news and forums. With more than 23 million fans across all platforms, Soompi offers English and Spanish services.

Since its establishment in 1998, Soompi has grown into one of the longest-running, and most frequently visited websites providing coverage of Korean music, celebrity news and entertainment.

Initially its visitors were mostly Koreans residing in foreign nations, with over 1.2 million people visiting the site. However, as of 2012, the majority of its members are non-Koreans in the United States, Canada, Singapore, the Philippines, and Malaysia, among others.

History
Soompi was founded in 1998 by Korean American web developer Susan Kang, In February 2011, it was acquired by Enswers, Inc., a Seoul-based IT venture company specializing in video search technology, and operated as a wholly owned subsidiary of it. When Enswers was acquired by another company, Soompi found a new home with Crunchyroll, a U.S.-based VOD site that specializes in anime, in 2013. Viki acquired Soompi on August 19, 2015.

Soompi Awards
Soompi is also known for its annual Soompi Awards, which began in 2005, and recognise K-pop and Korean drama acts. Winners are selected partially based on fan voting and partially based on Soompi's music charts.

References

American music websites
Internet properties established in 1998
K-pop websites
Rakuten